La Route du Rock is a biannual music festival that occurs in the city of Saint-Malo. Traditionally the festival was held every year but since 2006, a winter edition is held called collection d 'hiver after the French fashion word. The 20th occurrence of La Route du Rock transpired on the dates of 13th, 14 and 15 August 2010.

See also
List of music festivals

References

External links

 The La Route du Rock festival website
 The La Route du Rock unofficial festival website
 Daily Music Guide (Tess Askew)

Rock festivals in France